The following individuals were Earls (suo jure or jure uxoris) or Countesses (suo jure) during the reign of King Edward I of England who reigned from 1272 to 1307.

The period of tenure as Earl or Countess is given after the name and title of each individual, including any period of minority.

Earl of Arundel
Richard FitzAlan, 8th Earl of Arundel (1272-1302)
Edmund FitzAlan, 9th Earl of Arundel (1302-1326)
Earl of Cornwall
Edmund, 2nd Earl of Cornwall (1272-1300)
Earl of Devon
Isabella de Forz (née de Redvers), 8th Countess of Devon suo jure (1262-1293)
Earl of Essex
Humphrey de Bohun, 2nd Earl of Hereford, 1st Earl of Essex (1220-1275)
Humphrey de Bohun, 3rd Earl of Hereford, 2nd Earl of Essex (1275-1298)
Humphrey de Bohun, 4th Earl of Hereford, 3rd Earl of Essex (1298-1322)
Earl of Gloucester
Gilbert de Clare, 7th Earl of Gloucester, 6th Earl of Hertford,  (1262-1295)
Ralph de Monthermer, 1st Baron Monthermer, Earl of Gloucester jure uxoris (1295-1307)
Earl of Hereford
Humphrey de Bohun, 2nd Earl of Hereford, 1st Earl of Essex (1220-1275)
Humphrey de Bohun, 3rd Earl of Hereford, 2nd Earl of Essex (1275-1298)
Humphrey de Bohun, 4th Earl of Hereford, 3rd Earl of Essex (1298-1322)
Earl of Hertford
Gilbert de Clare, 7th Earl of Gloucester, 6th Earl of Hertford, (1262-1295)
Ralph de Monthermer, 1st Baron Monthermer, Earl of Hertford jure uxoris (1295-1307)
Earl of Lancaster
Edmund Crouchback, 1st Earl of Lancaster, 1st Earl of Leicester (1267-1296)
Thomas, 2nd Earl of Lancaster, 2nd Earl of Leicester (1296-1322)
Earl of Leicester
Edmund Crouchback, 1st Earl of Lancaster, 1st Earl of Leicester (1267-1296)
Thomas, 2nd Earl of Lancaster, 2nd Earl of Leicester (1296-1322)
Earl of Lincoln
Henry de Lacy, 3rd Earl of Lincoln (1272-1311)
Earl of Norfolk
Roger Bigod, 5th Earl of Norfolk (1270-1306)
Earl of Oxford
Robert de Vere, 5th Earl of Oxford (1263-1296)
Robert de Vere, 6th Earl of Oxford (1296-1331)
Earl of Pembroke
William de Valence, 1st Earl of Pembroke (? - 1296)
Aymer de Valence, 2nd Earl of Pembroke (1296-1324)
Earl of Richmond
John II, Duke of Brittany, 3rd Earl of Richmond (1268-1305)
John of Brittany, Earl of Richmond (1306-1334)
Earl of Salisbury
Margaret Longespée, 4th Countess of Salisbury suo jure (1261-1310)
Earl of Surrey
John de Warenne, 6th Earl of Surrey (1240-1304)
John de Warenne, 7th Earl of Surrey (1304-1347)
Earl of Warwick
William de Beauchamp, 9th Earl of Warwick (1268-1298)
Guy de Beauchamp, 10th Earl of Warwick (1298-1315)

References

Sources 

Ellis, Geoffrey. (1963) Earldoms in Fee: A Study in Peerage Law and History. London: The Saint Catherine Press, Limited.

Morris, Marc. (2005) The Bigod Earls of Norfolk in the Thirteenth Century. Woodbridge: The Boydell Press. 

Spencer, Andrew M. (2014) Nobility and Kingship in Medieval England: The Earls and Edward I, 1272-1307. Cambridge: Cambridge University Press. 

Edward I of England